List of Singapore festivals contains:

Subcategories:
Film festivals in Singapore
Music festivals in Singapore
Multi-sport events in Singapore

Specific festivals:
Asian Festival of Children's Content
i Light Marina Bay
Singapore Arts Festival 
Singapore Fashion Festival 
Singapore Fireworks Celebrations
Singapore Food Festival 
Singapore Garden Festival 
Singapore International Film Festival 
Singapore International Photography Festival 
Singapore's iPhone film festival 
Singapore National Day Parade
Singapore River Festival 
Singapore Sun Festival 
Singapore Writers Festival 
Singapore Youth Festival 
Singfest
Japanese Film Festival
 
 Singapore
Festivals
Singapore
Singapore
 Singapore
 Singapore